Kwi may refer to:
Kwi (Liberia), a cultural concept of Liberia
Kwi languages, a language family of southern Africa
Kuwait International Airport (IATA: KWI)